The Jackson Hole News&Guide is a weekly newspaper in the town of Jackson, Wyoming, United States. The News&Guide is published Wednesdays with an average circulation of 7,000 and is the newspaper of record for Teton County, Wyoming.

History
The first issue of the Jackson Hole News&Guide was printed on November 20, 2002, a by-product of a merger between two separate family-owned weekly newspapers in the community, the Jackson Hole News and the Jackson Hole Guide. Both were fierce competitors for more than thirty years after the News was launched in 1970. The merger combined the two papers’ editorial, advertising and production staffs and printing operations, and ownership was shared between publishers and stakeholders from both publications. The Guide’s superior printing press was moved across town to the News’ building at 1225 Maple Way, where the News&Guide is printed today.

Both newspapers’ publishers cited changing market forces, increasing printing costs and a desire to keep ownership of Jackson's newspaper local as the rationale for combining operations.

“The merger was consummated because the families that own the News and the Guide believe strongly in the local ownership of community newspapers,” Jackson Hole News publisher Mike Sellett wrote in a front page announcement on paper’s final independent issue on Nov. 13, 2002. “At a time when giant newspaper chains are gobbling up community newspapers at an alarming rate, we believe this merger will ensure that this newspaper will continue to be owned and published by people who live in this valley.”

Jackson Hole Guide owner and publisher Liz McCabe expressed in her own announcement in the final issue of her newspaper — also on Nov. 13, 2002 — that it made sense for the two papers to join forces. “This merger prevents either newspaper from being swallowed up by a syndicate,” McCabe wrote. “Both Mike [Sellett] and I feel that this should never happen.”

Sellett and McCabe co-published the Jackson Hole News&Guide until McCabe’s death in June 2012 at age 101. Later that year Sellett and McCabe’s heirs sold their shares to the paper’s chief operating officer, Kevin Olson, who formed Teton Media Works as the parent company for the News&Guide and its sister publication, the Jackson Hole Daily, and a suite of magazines including Range, A Grand Wedding, Headwaters, Teton Family magazine and Jackson Hole magazine. Teton Media Works also owns the digital marketing agency Orijin Media and the online news stream Buckrail.com.

In May 2021, the News&Guide’s associate publisher, Adam Meyer, became a minority shareholder in Teton Media Works. Meyer is also vice president and COO of the company.

The News&Guide covers news, sports and feature stories in the town of Jackson and Teton County, Wyoming, and specializes in environmental issues in the Greater Yellowstone Ecosystem.

Since its inception in 2002 the staff at the News&Guide has been recognized with several editorial, design, photography and advertising awards from several media advocacy groups including the Wyoming Press Association, National Newspaper Association, Local Media Association and the National Press Photographers Association.

References

Weekly newspapers published in the United States
Newspapers published in Wyoming
Jackson, Wyoming
Newspapers established in 2002
2002 establishments in Wyoming
American companies established in 2002